William P. "Bill" Foley II (born December 29, 1944) is an American businessman and former attorney, specializing in financial services. He is chairman of Fidelity National Financial, Cannae Holdings and Black Knight Financial Services, and vice chairman of Fidelity National Information Services Inc. (FIS). Foley is the lead investor in Black Knight Sports & Entertainment, a consortium that was awarded an expansion ice hockey franchise named the Vegas Golden Knights for Las Vegas, Nevada, that began play in the National Hockey League in 2017.

Growing up, Foley mostly lived in Texas with his family and extended family, who were ranchers. For a time, he lived in Ottawa, Ontario, when his father was posted in the United States Air Force there. Foley played shinny, an informal type of ice hockey, and started a lifelong appreciation for the sport.

Foley attended the United States Military Academy. While a cadet, he made $40,000 on the stock market, which he invested in during his spare time. Upon graduating from West Point, Foley was commissioned as a Second Lieutenant in the US Air Force, where during his career he negotiated million-dollar defense contracts with Boeing. After leaving the Air Force, Foley moved into corporate law upon earning his J.D. from the University of Washington in 1974. Later he bought and revitalized the then struggling title insurance firm Fidelity National Financial. He later invested in wineries, golf courses, hotels, ski resorts, steak houses, fast-food restaurants and auto parts manufacturers.

Sports ownership
While Foley was living in Jacksonville, Florida, he explored buying the National Football League's Jacksonville Jaguars before the team was acquired by Shahid Khan.

In June 2016, Foley and Black Knight Sports & Entertainment was awarded a National Hockey League expansion franchise that became the Vegas Golden Knights. The Golden Knights began play in the 2017–18 season at the new T-Mobile Arena, and also acquired a minority ownership of the facility. In 2020, Black Knight Sports & Entertainment purchased an American Hockey League franchise to act as a development team for the Golden Knights, relocating the San Antonio Rampage to become the Henderson Silver Knights. The Silver Knights played out of Orleans Arena until the Dollar Loan Center, which is operated by Black Knight Sports & Entertainment, is complete in 2022.

In 2021, Foley announced Black Knight Sports & Entertainment had purchased an expansion team in the Indoor Football League to begin play in 2022 at the Dollar Loan Center in Henderson, Nevada. On August 23, 2021, the team unveiled their name and logo as the Vegas Knight Hawks.

On December 13, 2022, a group of investors led by Foley completed a deal to purchase Premier League football club AFC Bournemouth, with Foley assuming the role of chairman. Ahead of the deal, he was present at one of Bournemouth's Premier League matches vs Leicester City, with the Cherries winning 2–1.

On January 13, 2023, Foley acquired a significant minority stake in French Ligue 1 club FC Lorient, creating a partnership with Bournemouth.

References

1944 births
Living people
American financial businesspeople
American sports businesspeople
National Hockey League owners
People from Austin, Texas
Businesspeople from Texas
United States Military Academy alumni
University of Washington School of Law alumni
Vegas Golden Knights owners
People from Jacksonville, Florida
Businesspeople from Florida
Businesspeople from Las Vegas
Military personnel from Texas
Chairmen and investors of football clubs in England